Lee Palfreyman (born 5 January 1977 in Liverpool) is an English professional darts player who plays in the Professional Darts Corporation events.

His biggest success on TV was reaching the semi-finals of the 2002 Las Vegas Desert Classic, where he was eventually defeated by Phil Taylor. He then qualified for the 2002 PDC World Matchplay, where he lost to Paul Whitworth.  He then qualified for the 2003 PDC World Darts Championship, where he lost in the qualifiers to Mick Manning.

His brother, Joey, is also a professional darts player.

World Championship Results

PDC
 2003: Last 40 (lost to Mick Manning 2–4)

References

External links
Profile and stats on Darts Database

1977 births
Living people
English darts players
Professional Darts Corporation former tour card holders
Sportspeople from Liverpool